Sonia Raiziss Giop (October 13, 1906 – March 19, 1994) was an American poet, critic, and translator.

Life and career
Raiziss was born in Germany and immigrated to the U.S. as a child. She was raised in Philadelphia, where her father biochemist George W. Raiziss, taught at the University of Philadelphia. She saw her earliest poems published while she was still in high school. Raiziss went on to earn undergraduate and doctoral degrees at the University of Philadelphia and also studied at Columbia University. While studying at the Sorbonne, she published her first poetry collection, Through a Glass Darkly.

was an editor of Chelsea (magazine), from 1960–1994, with Ursule Molinaro, featuring poems and prose by Denise Levertov, Sylvia Plath, Umberto Eco, Raymond Carver, and Grace Paley.  She corresponded with Laura Riding, and David Finkel.

Her work appeared in American prefaces, The Atlantic, Beloit Poetry Journal. Granite, The Prairie Schooner, Plainsong, Virginia Quarterly Review, Yale Poetry Review.

As a member of the League of American Writers, she served on its Keep America Out of War Committee in January 1940 during the period of the Hitler-Stalin pact.

She lived in Bucks County, Pennsylvania.  She married Alfredo Giop de Palchi.  She adopted a son, Peter St. Mu Raiziss of Sacramento, California. Sonia died in Manhattan.

Philanthropy
Her Sonia Raiziss Giop Charitable Foundation (Alfredo de Palchi trustee) continues to fund the Jane Austen Essay Contest, Bordighera Poetry Prize, and the Raiziss/de Palchi Translation Awards.

Awards
 1937 Guggenheim Fellowship

Works

Poetry
 
 "The Unripe Dead", Verse Daily, 2006

Translation
 
 "The Scorpion's Dark Dance" (1993), Alfredo de Palchi.

Criticism
 "Metaphysical Passion: Seven Modern American Poets and the 17th-Century Tradition,"  1952  University of Philadelphia and reissued by Greenwood Press in 1970.

References

External links 

 Alfredo de Palchi and Sona Raiziss Papers. General Collection, Beinecke Rare Book and Manuscript Library, Yale University.

1906 births
1994 deaths
Writers from Philadelphia
German emigrants to the United States
American women poets
20th-century American poets
Columbia University alumni
Thomas Jefferson University alumni
University of Paris alumni
20th-century American women writers